Steve Harvey is a syndicated daytime talk show that ran for five seasons from September 4, 2012, to July 13, 2017, with a total of 920 episodes during its run. It was hosted by comedian and media personality Steve Harvey and taped at the NBC Tower studios in Chicago, Illinois. The show was produced by Endemol Shine North America and distributed by NBCUniversal Television Distribution.

On November 11, 2016, it was announced that Steve Harvey would end at the conclusion of the 2016–17 season. Concurrently, it was announced that Harvey would host a new talk show beginning the following season, Steve, which was produced in Los Angeles in partnership with IMG and NBCUniversal Television Distribution.
Pluto TV

Ratings
Out of the five new talk shows to premiere during the 2012–13 television season, Steve Harvey ranked second, behind Katie, but ahead of The Jeff Probst Show, The Ricki Lake Show, and The Trisha Goddard Show.  During the week of December 31, 2012, Steve Harvey averaged 1.987 million viewers.

Awards and nominations

References

External links
 
 

2010s American television talk shows
2012 American television series debuts
2017 American television series endings
First-run syndicated television programs in the United States
Television series by Universal Television
English-language television shows
Television series by Endemol